The 2009 WNBA season is the 13th season for the San Antonio Silver Stars franchise of the Women's National Basketball Association. It is their 7th in San Antonio. The Silver Stars were unsuccessful in their attempt to advance to the WNBA Finals for the second consecutive season.

Offseason

Dispersal Draft
Based on the Silver Stars' 2008 record, they would pick 13th in the Houston Comets dispersal draft. The Silver Stars waived their pick.

WNBA Draft
The following are the Silver Stars' selections in the 2009 WNBA Draft.

Transactions
July 31: The Silve Stars signed Ann Wauters and waived Katie Mattera.
June 5: The Silver Stars waived Joyce Ekworomadu and Bernadette Ngoyisa.
June 1: The Silver Stars waived Valeriya Berezhynska and Candyce Bingham.
May 28: The Silver Stars waived Amber Petillion.
May 25: The Silver Stars waived Morenike Atunrase and signed Joyce Ekworomadu.
May 18: The Silver Stars signed Amber Petillion to a training camp contract.
May 15: The Silver Stars waived Adrienne Ross.
May 12: The Silver Stars waived Sandora Irvin.
May 11: The Silver Stars signed Katie Feenstra Mattera.
April 30: The Silver Stars re-signed Edwige Lawson-Wade.
March 30: The Silver Stars signed Belinda Snell.
March 16: The Silver Stars signed free agent Bernadette Ngoyisa.
January 23: The Silver Stars signed Valeriya Berezhynska to a training-camp contract.
January 8: The Silver Stars re-signed free agent Vickie Johnson.
January 7: The Silver Stars signed Sophia Young to a three-year extension.
April 9, 2008: The Silver Stars traded their first round 2009 Draft pick to the Atlanta Dream in exchange for the Dream's second round 2009 pick as part of the Ann Wauters/Camille Little transaction.

Free agents

Additions

Subtractions

Roster

Season standings

Schedule

Preseason

|- align="center" bgcolor="ffbbbb"
| 1 || May 30 || 7:00pm || @ Detroit || 55-62 || Young (14) || Mattera (8) || Johnson (4) || Traverse City West H.S.  2,109 || 0-1
|- align="center" bgcolor="ffbbbb"
| 2 || June 2 || 8:00pm || Indiana || 60-67 || Hammon (12) || Frazee (8) || Johnson (3) || Austin Convention Center   || 0-2
|-

Regular season

|- align="center" bgcolor="ffbbbb"
| 1 || June 6 || 10:00pm || @ Phoenix || NBA TVKMYS || 79-90 || Young (25) || Riley (13) || Hammon (8) || US Airways Center  13,582 || 0-1
|- align="center" bgcolor="bbffbb"
| 2 || June 13 || 8:00pm || New York || NBA TVKMYSMSG || 63-60 || Hammon (16) || Johnson (7) || Hammon (4) || AT&T Center  10,572 || 1-1
|- align="center" bgcolor="ffbbbb"
| 3 || June 19 || 7:30pm || @ New York || NBA TVMSG || 61-77 || Crossley, Lawson-Wade (12) || Young (7) || Darling, Lawson-Wade (4) || Madison Square Garden  8,046 || 1-2
|- align="center" bgcolor="ffbbbb"
| 4 || June 21 || 3:00pm || @ Connecticut || NBA TVWCTX || 58-71 || Young (22) || Riley, Young (7) || Darling (4) || Mohegan Sun Arena  6,928 || 1-3
|- align="center" bgcolor="bbffbb"
| 5 || June 23 || 7:30pm || Phoenix || ESPN2 || 91-87 || Hammon (19) || Young (8) || Young (5) || AT&T Center  6,692 || 2-3
|- align="center" bgcolor="bbffbb"
| 6 || June 26 || 8:00pm || Sacramento ||  || 62-52 || Hammon (26) || Young (10) || Hammon (6) || AT&T Center  7,973 || 3-3
|- align="center" bgcolor="ffbbbb"
| 7 || June 20 || 8:00pm || Washington ||  || 82-84 || Young (21) || Johnson (7) || Darling (6) || AT&T Center  4,723 || 3-4
|-

|- align="center" bgcolor="bbffbb"
| 8 || July 3 || 8:00pm || Chicago ||  || 85-72 || Young (19) || Riley, Young (8) || Hammon (10) || AT&T Center  6,662 || 4-4
|- align="center" bgcolor="ffbbbb"
| 9 || July 7 || 3:00pm || @ Seattle ||  || 53-66 || Hammon (13) || Young (7) || Hammon (5) || KeyArena  10,137 || 4-5
|- align="center" bgcolor="bbffbb"
| 10 || July 10 || 8:00pm || @ Minnesota ||  || 77-61 || Young (21) || Riley (9) || Lawson-Wade (4) || Target Center  7,409 || 5-5
|- align="center" bgcolor="ffbbbb"
| 11 || July 12 || 7:00pm || Minnesota || NBA TVKMYS || 76-83 || Hammon (26) || Young (8) || Hammon (5) || AT&T Center  6,568 || 5-6
|- align="center" bgcolor="bbffbb"
| 12 || July 15 || 11:30am || @ Washington ||  || 79-78 || Hammon (21) || Frazee (6) || Darling, Hammon (5) || Verizon Center  17,220 || 6-6
|- align="center" bgcolor="ffbbbb"
| 13 || July 17 || 8:00pm || Connecticut ||  || 64-72 || Hammon (24) || Frazee, Young (9) || Hammon (4) || AT&T Center  9,524 || 6-7
|- align="center" bgcolor="ffbbbb"
| 14 || July 19 || 6:00pm || @ Chicago || NBA TVCN100 || 75-85 || Hammon (22) || Hammon, Perperoglou (5) || Hammon, Johnson (3) || UIC Pavilion  3,282 || 6-8
|- align="center" bgcolor="bbffbb"
| 15 || July 23 || 12:30pm || Indiana ||  || 84-65 || Young (24) || Frazee (8) || Hammon, Johnson (4) || AT&T Center  9,985 || 7-8
|- align="center" bgcolor="bbffbb"
| 16 || July 28 || 8:00pm|| Seattle || KMYS || 74-71 || Hammon (24) || Frazee (7) || Hammon (4) || AT&T Center  5,382 || 8-8
|- align="center" bgcolor="ffbbbb"
| 17 || July 30 || 2:30pm || @ Sacramento ||  || 93-101 (OT) || Hammon (38) || Young (11) || Hammon (6) || ARCO Arena  10,461 || 8-9
|-

|- align="center" bgcolor="ffbbbb"
| 18 || August 1 || 10:00pm || @ Seattle || NBA TVKMYS || 82-85 (OT) || Hammon (20) || Hammon (10) || Young (4) || KeyArena  8,167 || 8-10
|- align="center" bgcolor="bbffbb"
| 19 || August 4 || 3:00pm || @ Los Angeles ||  || 63-59 || Hammon (20) || Young (9) || Hammon (5) || STAPLES Center  13,865 || 9-10
|- align="center" bgcolor="ffbbbb"
| 20 || August 6 || 8:00pm || Atlanta ||  || 84-92 || Hammon (26) || Young (9) || Snell (4) || AT&T Center  5,042 || 9-11
|- align="center" bgcolor="bbffbb"
| 21 || August 9 || 6:00pm || @ Minnesota ||  || 89-87 || Hammon (22) || Young (7) || Hammon (9) || Target Center  7,764 || 10-11
|- align="center" bgcolor="ffbbbb"
| 22 || August 11 || 8:00pm || Sacramento ||  || 73-90 || Young (14) || Hammon, Young (6) || Johnson, Lawson-Wade (5) || AT&T Center  4,961 || 10-12
|- align="center" bgcolor="ffbbbb"
| 23 || August 13 || 10:00pm || @ Phoenix ||  || 83-95 || Young (29) || Wauters (10) || Hammon (8) || US Airways Center  6,522 || 10-13
|- align="center" bgcolor="bbffbb"
| 24 || August 15 || 8:00pm || Phoenix || NBA TVKMYS || 106-89 || Young (25) || Frazee (9) || Hammon (6) || AT&T Center  8,933 || 11-13
|- align="center" bgcolor="ffbbbb"
| 25 || August 20 || 7:30pm || @ Atlanta ||  || 87-93 || Hammon (23) || Wauters (7) || Hammon, Lawson-Wade (5) || Philips Arena  5,848 || 11-14
|- align="center" bgcolor="ffbbbb"
| 26 || August 21 || 8:00pm || Los Angeles || NBA TVKMYS || 66-67 (OT) || Young (31) || Young (7) || Hammon (6) || AT&T Center  9,540 || 11-15
|- align="center" bgcolor="ffbbbb"
| 27 || August 23 || 6:00pm || @ Detroit ||  || 84-99 || Young (19) || Young (5) || Darling (7) || Palace of Auburn Hills  7,130 || 11-16
|- align="center" bgcolor="ffbbbb"
| 28 || August 27 || 7:00pm || @ Indiana || NBA TVFSI || 66-77 || Wauters, Young (18) || Wauters (14) || Hammon (6) || Conseco Fieldhouse  6,836 || 11-17
|- align="center" bgcolor="bbffbb"
| 29 || August 29 || 3:00pm || Detroit || ESPN2 || 100-88 (OT) || Hammon (32) || Wauters (11) || Hammon (9) || AT&T Center  7,735 || 12-17
|-

|- align="center" bgcolor="bbffbb"
| 30 || September 1 || 8:00pm || Minnesota ||  || 84-82 (2OT) || Hammon (29) || Riley (8) || Hammon (5) || AT&T Center  4,881 || 13-17
|- align="center" bgcolor="bbffbb"
| 31 || September 5 || 8:00pm || Los Angeles ||  || 89-72 || Johnson (27) || Lawson-Wade (5) || Lawson-Wade (11) || AT&T Center  8,631 || 14-17
|- align="center" bgcolor="ffbbbb"
| 32 || September 8 || 10:30pm || @ Los Angeles || NBA TVKMYS || 68-76 || Crossley (16) || Hammon, Wauters, Young (4) || Hammon (7) || STAPLES Center  10,476 || 14-18
|- align="center" bgcolor="bbffbb"
| 33 || September 10 || 10:00pm || @ Sacramento || || 80-71 || Hammon (27) || Wauters, Young (6) || Johnson, Lawson-Wade (5) || ARCO Arena  7,566 || 15-18
|- align="center" bgcolor="ffbbbb"
| 34 || September 12 || 8:00pm || Seattle ||  || 55-64 || Crossley (12) || Perperoglou (11) || Darling (6) || AT&T Center  10,153 || 15-19
|-

| All games are viewable on WNBA LiveAccess

Postseason

|- align="center" bgcolor="bbffbb"
| 1 || September 17 || 9:00pm || Phoenix || ESPN2 || 92-91 || Young (24) || Wauters (11) || Johnson (8) || AT&T Center  5,721 || 1-0
|- align="center" bgcolor="ffbbbb"
| 2 || September 19 || 10:00pm || @ Phoenix || NBA TV || 78-106 || Young (19) || Wauters (5) || Johnson (4) || US Airways Center  7,267 || 1-1
|- align="center" bgcolor="ffbbbb"
| 3 || September 21 || 10:00pm || @ Phoenix || ESPN2 || 92-100 || Hammon (29) || Young (8) || Wauters (5) || US Airways Center  6,895 || 1-2
|-

Regular Season Statistics

Player Statistics

Team Statistics

Awards and honors
Becky Hammon was named WNBA Western Conference Player of the Week for the week of July 27, 2009.
Becky Hammon was named WNBA Western Conference Player of the Week for the week of August 3, 2009.
Vickie Johnson was named WNBA Western Conference Player of the Week for the week of August 31, 2009.
Becky Hammon was named to the 2009 WNBA All-Star Team as a Western Conference starter.
Sophia Young was named to the 2009 WNBA All-Star Team as a Western Conference reserve.
Becky Hammon was named to the All-WNBA First Team.
Sophia Young was named to the All-WNBA Second Team.

References

External links

San Antonio Stars seasons
San Antonio